Frechette or Fréchette may refer to:

People
 Louis-Honoré Fréchette (1839–1908), Canadian politician and author
 Louise Fréchette (born 1946), Canadian diplomat and public servant
 Mark Frechette (1947–1975), American actor
 Pauline Fréchette (1889-1943), poet, dramatist, journalist, nun; daughter of Louis-Honoré Fréchette
 Peter Frechette (born 1956), American actor
 Raynald Fréchette (1933–2007), Canadian jurist and politician
 Sylvie Fréchette (born 1967), Canadian synchronised swimmer
 Evelyn Frechette (1907–1969), American singer and waitress, and associate of John Dillinger

Places
 Frechette Island, Manitoulin, Ontario, Canada

See also
 Flechette
 Fréchet (disambiguation)